Rojs is both a given name and a surname. Notable people with the name include:

 Ljubo Ćesić Rojs (born 1958), Croatian army general and politician
 Rojs Piziks (born 1971), Latvian decathlete and high jumper

See also
 Rojo (surname)